Giuseppe Gasparo Mezzofanti (17 September 1774 – 15 March 1849) was an Italian cardinal and famed hyperpolyglot.

Life 
Born to humble parents in Bologna, he showed exceptional mnemonic skills as well as a flair for music and foreign language learning from a very young age. He studied at the Piarists where he had the chance to meet several missionaries from various countries. By speaking with them he began learning several new languages including Swedish, German, Spanish and Southern American native languages as well as studying Latin and ancient Greek in school. He completed his theological studies before he had reached the minimum age for ordination as a priest. During this period he also studied Asian Languages; in 1797 he was ordained a priest and became professor of Arabic, Hebrew, Asian Languages and Greek at the University of Bologna. In 1797, an English couple Georgiana Hare-Naylor and her husband had to return home. They left three of their children in the care of Professor Clotilda Tambroni and a Spanish priest, and they appointed Mezzofanti tutor to their eldest son. This was thought an odd decision but Georgiana took her own council and her eldest later attributed his love of learning to the time he spent that year.

Mezzofanti (and Tambroni) later lost the university position for refusing to take the oath of allegiance required by the Cisalpine Republic, which governed Bologna at the time. Between 1799 and 1800 he visited many foreign people who had been wounded during the Napoleonic wars to attend to their cures and he started to learn other European languages.

In 1803 he was appointed assistant librarian of the Institute of Bologna, and soon afterwards was reinstated as professor of Oriental languages and of Greek.  The chair of Oriental languages was suppressed by the viceroy in 1808, but again rehabilitated on the restoration of Pope Pius VII in 1814. Mezzofanti held this post until he left Bologna to go to Rome in 1831 as a member of the Congregation for the Propagation of the Faith (Congregatio de Propaganda Fide), the Catholic Church's governing body for missionary activities. 
In 1833, he succeeded Angelo Mai as Custodian-in-Chief of the Vatican Library, and in 1838 was made cardinal of the title of St. Onofrio al Gianicolo and director of studies in the Congregation for the Propagation of the Faith.  His other diverse interests included ethnology, archaeology, numismatics, and astronomy.

List of languages spoken

Mezzofanti was well known for being a hyperpolyglot who, according to (Russell 1858), spoke at least thirty languages "with rare excellence":

He was reported to have spoken nine other languages fluently, and with dozens of others he is said to have had at least basic knowledge.

See also
List of polyglots

Notes

References 
 Alphons Bellesheim, Giuseppe Cardinal Mezzofanti (Würzburg, 1880)
 Charles William Russell, Life of the Cardinal Mezzofanti  (1858)
 Augustin Manavitt, Esquisse historique sur le cardinal Mezzofanti (1853)
 U. Benigni, Giuseppe Mezzofanti, Catholic Encyclopedia (1911)
 
 

1774 births
1849 deaths
Clergy from Bologna
19th-century Italian cardinals
Italian philologists
Italian librarians
Cardinals created by Pope Gregory XVI